The 1975–1978 nuclear test series was a group of 29 nuclear tests conducted by France in 1975–1978. These tests followed the 1971–1974 French nuclear tests series and preceded the 1979–1980 French nuclear tests series.

References

French nuclear weapons testing
1975 in France
1976 in France
1977 in France
1978 in France
1979 in France